Sacramento is a former civil parish (freguesia) in the city and municipality of Lisbon, Portugal. It had a total area of 0.08 km2 and total population of 880 inhabitants (2001); density: 18,864.2 inhabitants/km2. At the administrative reorganization of Lisbon on 8 December 2012 it became part of the parish Santa Maria Maior.

Main sites
São Roque Church
Carmo Convent

References 

Former parishes of Lisbon